Billy Hartman (born 1957) is a Scottish actor, well known for playing the part of Terry Woods on ITV's Emmerdale from 1995 until his character was killed off in 2011 after 16 years.

Career
Together with Emmerdale co-stars Steve Halliwell and Alun Lewis, he was a member of UK 1990s country rock trio The Woolpackers, who had a UK hit single "Hillbilly Rock Hillbilly Roll" in November 1996.

He also played a small role in the film Highlander. He played the part of Dougal MacLeod, cousin of Connor McLeod.

Under the name GBH, Hartman was the host of the rock 'n' roll revival television show Oh Boy in 1979.

Hartman also starred in the comedy series Russ Abbot'''s Madhouse in the early 1980s.

Hartman played a teenager in 1980s American horror film Slaughter High. Hartman also appeared as Isaac Talentire in the original west end production of Howard Goodall's musical The Hired Man.Billy played “Billy” in Minder Series 4, Ep9 - Windows.

In 1993 he appeared in The Bill playing Superintendent Greenall of the major incident team.

Hartman appeared as Dave Slade, whose dog was attacking sheep, in the 1994 Heartbeat episode "Wild Thing". Series 4 episode 1.
In 1994 Hartman played probation officer Dave Cowden in A Touch of Frost Minority of One series 2 episode 01

On 26 October 2013, Hartman played the role of Graham O'Reilly in Casualty''.

30 July 2019, he played the part of a crooked jeweller in Keeping Faith.(2nd Series, episode 2 of 6, BBC1) The character was unnamed in the credits.

Filmography

References

External links

Living people
Scottish male television actors
Scottish male soap opera actors
Place of birth missing (living people)
Scottish male film actors
1957 births